Alexander of Hierapolis (fl. 253 AD) was a bishop of Hierapolis in Phrygia (modern Pamukkale, Turkey).

Alexander was the author of a book entitled On the new things introduced by Christ into the world, which is no longer extant.

References

3rd-century bishops in Roman Anatolia
Ancient Greek writers known only from secondary sources
Roman-era Phrygians
3rd-century Romans
3rd-century writers